Strictly Business (literally Businessmen) is a 1962 Soviet black-and-white comedy film directed by Leonid Gaidai, based on three short stories by O. Henry: "The Roads We Take", "Makes the Whole World Kin", and "The Ransom of Red Chief".

The film's title is borrowed from the book of short stories by O. Henry titled Strictly Business (1910, Деловые люди in Russian translation), but none of the short stories it includes were adapted for the screen.

Cast
 "The Roads We Take" (Дороги, которые мы выбираем)
 Vladlen Paulus as "Shark" Dodson (voiced by Oleg Dal)
 Aleksandr Shvorin as Bob Tidball
 Viktor Gromov as Mr Williams
 Vladimir Pitsek as machinist (uncredited)
 Viktor Uralsky as fireman (uncredited)
 Lev Lobov as conductor of the coach (uncredited)
 Yuri Chulyukin as Peabody, clerk (uncredited)

 "Makes the Whole World Kin" (Родственные души)
 Rostislav Plyatt as landlord
 Yuri Nikulin as thief

 "The Ransom of Red Chief" (Вождь краснокожих)
 Georgy Vitsin as Sam, adventurer
 Aleksei Smirnov as Bill Driscoll
Sergei Tikhonov as Johnny Dorset (voiced by Margarita Korabelnikova, in some scenes speaks in his own voice)
 Georgy Millyar as Ebenezer Dorset, Johnny's father (uncredited)
 Yevgeny Yevstigneyev as citizen (voice, uncredited)

Sources 
 
 
 Strictly Business (1962) (English subtitles)
 Деловые люди

1962 comedy films
1962 films
1960s Western (genre) comedy films
Adaptations of works by O. Henry
Films based on multiple works
Films based on short fiction
Films directed by Leonid Gaidai
Films shot in Crimea
Films shot in Moscow
Films shot in Ukraine
Mosfilm films
Ostern films
Russian anthology films
Russian comedy films
Soviet black-and-white films
Soviet comedy films
Soviet anthology films
Russian black-and-white films